Qırx Çıraq is a village in the municipality of Çuxanlı in the Salyan Rayon of Azerbaijan.

References

Populated places in Salyan District (Azerbaijan)